Douglas Beresford Malise Ronald Graham, 5th Duke of Montrose, KT (7 November 1852 – 10 December 1925) was a Scottish nobleman and soldier. He was the son of James Graham, 4th Duke of Montrose and Chief of Clan Graham in the Scottish Highlands.

Early life
Lord Douglas Graham was born at St George Hanover Square in 1852, the third and eldest surviving son of the 4th Duke of Montrose and Hon. Caroline Agnes Horsley Beresford. He had two elder brothers, both named James, and thus was not expected to succeed, but both died prematurely in succession. His mother, a notorious society hostess and racehorse owner, was a daughter of John Beresford, 2nd Lord Decies, himself a grandson of Marcus Beresford, 1st Earl of Tyrone. He was educated at Eton College and succeeded his father in 1874.

Career

He joined the Coldstream Guards in 1872, transferred to the 5th Royal Irish Lancers in 1874, and retired in 1878. Later he was Colonel commanding the 3rd Battalion of the Argyll and Sutherland Highlanders. Montrose served in the Second Boer War (medal and two clasps). He was appointed a Knight of the Thistle in 1879 and was Chancellor of the Order from 1917. Montrose fought with the Argyll and Sutherland Highlanders in the First World War. He later served as Captain-General of the Royal Company of Archers, the King's Bodyguard for Scotland.

Montrose was aide-de-camp to Queen Victoria, King Edward VII and George V successively. He was Lord Lieutenant of Stirlingshire from 1885 to 1925, Hereditary Sheriff of Dumbartonshire (now Dunbartonshire), Lord Clerk Register from 1890 until his death, and Lord High Commissioner to the General Assembly of the Church of Scotland in 1916–1917. In January 1900 he accepted the Presidency of the Scotland Branch of the British Empire League.

Personal life
Lord Montrose married Violet Hermione Graham, daughter of Sir Frederick Ulric Graham 3rd Baronet of Netherby and his wife Lady Jane Hermione St. Maur (daughter of Edward St. Maur, 12th Duke of Somerset); they had five children:

 Commodore James Graham, 6th Duke of Montrose (1878–1954), who married Lady Mary Douglas-Hamilton, only daughter of the 12th Duke of Hamilton and had issue, including the 7th Duke of Montrose.
 Lady Helen Violet Graham (1879–1945), lady-in-waiting to Queen Elizabeth; died without issue.
 Lady Hermione Emily Graham (1882–1978), who married Sir Donald Walter Cameron, 25th Lochiel, KT and had issue, including the 26th Lochiel.
 Brigadier Lord Douglas Malise Graham (born 1883), who married the Hon. Rachael Mary Holland.
 Captain Lord Alastair Mungo Graham (born 1886), who married Lady Meriel Olivia Bathurst.

Montrose died in December 1925 in a nursing home at 6 Park Gardens in the Park District of Glasgow. He was buried at Buchanan Castle and passed on the title to his son the 6th Duke of Montrose.

References

External links

Douglas Graham, 5th Duke of Montrose at the National Portrait Gallery, London

1852 births
1925 deaths
Coldstream Guards officers
5th Royal Irish Lancers officers
Argyll and Sutherland Highlanders officers
205
Knights of the Thistle
Lord-Lieutenants of Stirlingshire
Lords High Commissioner to the General Assembly of the Church of Scotland
Douglas
People educated at Eton College
British racehorse owners and breeders
British Army personnel of the Second Boer War